Karim Khudsiani is an Iranian Georgian Screenwriter, Television presenter and actor.

Career

Writer
 Saye roshan 2011 (series) 
 Ba ejaze bozorgtarha 2009 (series) 
 Terme (series) 
 Tajrobe haye aghaye khoshbakht (series) 
 Labkhande bedune lahje (series) 
 Siliye Shirin 
 Ta madare 10 daraje 2015
 Chocolate 2017
 Katyusha 2018

Presenter
 Simaye Khanevade 
 Saate Sheni 
 Emrouz hanouz tamoum nashode

Actor
 Secret government (dolate makhfi) series 
 Hamchon sarv 
 Khastegaran

See also
Iranian Georgians

References

External links

Iranian screenwriters
Actors from Isfahan
1979 births
Iranian people of Georgian descent
Iranian television presenters
Iranian male television actors
Iranian male film actors
Living people
Iranian radio and television presenters